Scott Minto (born 20 September 1978) is a former professional rugby league footballer who played on the  in 14 games for the North Queensland Cowboys and 39 games for the Brisbane Broncos in the NRL.

Background
Minto was born in Rockhampton, Queensland, Australia.
He is related to the infamous Hides family of Queensland. 
His nephew Matt played for the Newcastle Knights.

Career
Minto's junior rugby league club was the Yeppoon Seagulls in Central Queensland.

His brief career included spells at both the Brisbane Broncos and North Queensland Cowboys. His preferred position was wing. In 2003 while playing for Brisbane, Minto scored the winning try in golden point against Melbourne where he jumped for the try line.  Fox Sports commentator Warren Smith described Minto's jump as if he was a hurdler at The Olympics.

Minto was the Executive Officer of the Central Comets a team in the Queensland Cup. After 3 years as CEO Minto resigned on 8 April 2011, the share price notably dropping considerably upon announcement.

In the years since his retirement, Minto has become somewhat of a cult figure in the history of rugby league and has featured in several online memes. In 2017, betting company Sportsbet erected a statue out the front of Suncorp Stadium in Brisbane with the words engraved "The People's Immortal". It followed a torrent of social media support for Minto after NRL chief executive Todd Greenberg revealed there would be up to two inductees into rugby league's most exclusive club.

References

External links
The Central Queensland Comets

1948 births
Living people
Australian rugby league players
Brisbane Broncos players
North Queensland Cowboys players
Rugby league wingers
Rugby league players from Rockhampton, Queensland